

This is a list of the National Register of Historic Places listings in Hamilton County, Ohio.

This is intended to be a complete list of the properties and districts on the National Register of Historic Places in Hamilton County, Ohio, United States. Latitude and longitude coordinates are provided for many National Register properties and districts; these locations may be seen together in a map.

There are 381 properties and districts listed on the National Register in the county, including 14 National Historic Landmarks. The city of Cincinnati is the location of 283 of these properties and districts, including 12 National Historic Landmarks; they are listed separately, while the remaining 98 properties and districts, including 3 National Historic Landmarks, are listed here.

Current listings

Cincinnati

Outside Cincinnati

|}

See also

 List of National Historic Landmarks in Ohio
 Listings in neighboring counties: Boone (KY), Butler, Campbell (KY), Clermont, Dearborn (IN), Franklin (IN), Kenton (KY), Warren
 National Register of Historic Places listings in Ohio

References

 
Hamilton